= The Horse and Groom, Hatfield =

Pub in Hatfield, Hertfordshire, England

Coordinates: 51°45′47″N 0°12′49″W

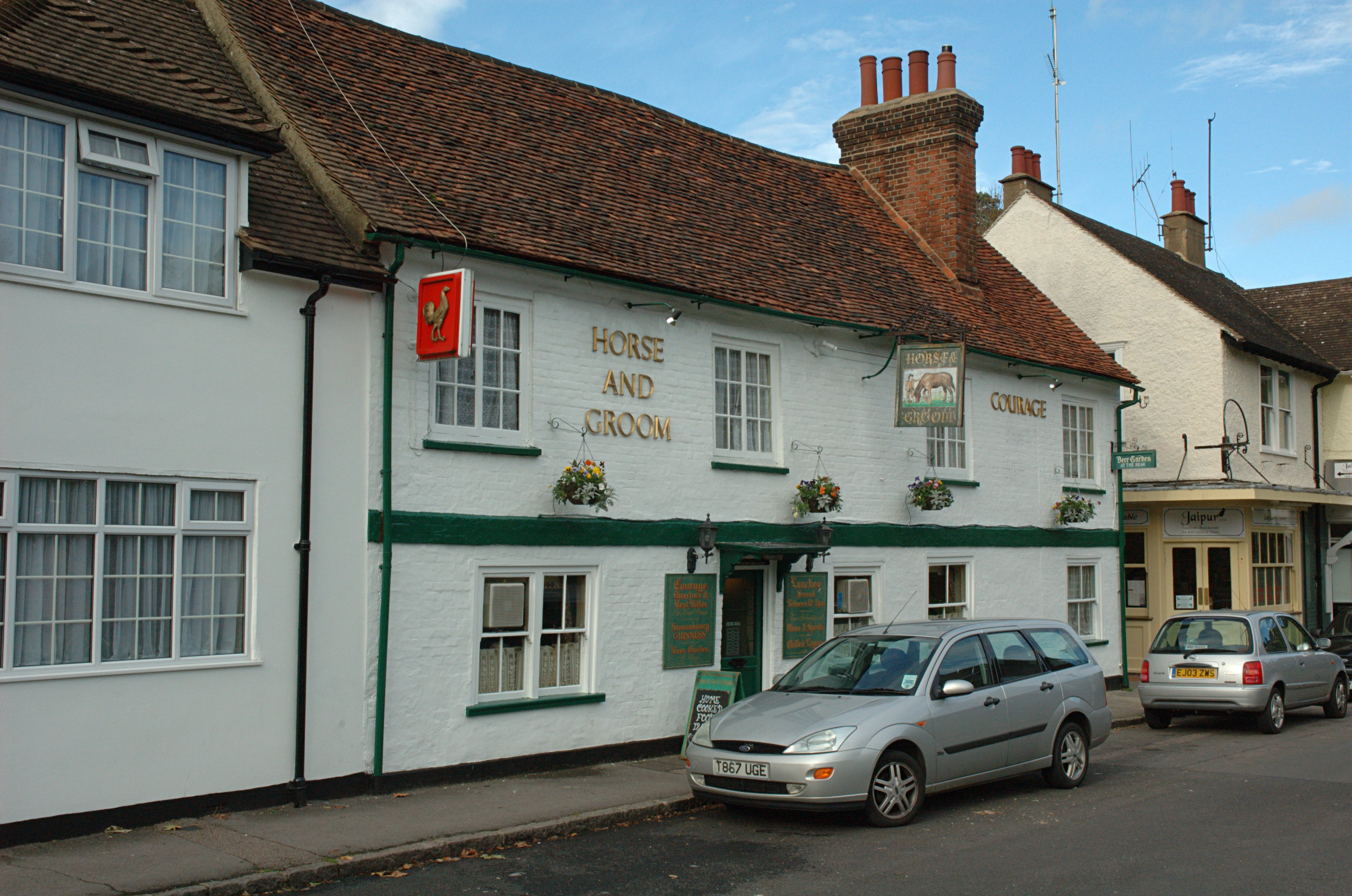
The Horse and Groom

The Horse and Groom is a grade II listed public house in Park Street, Hatfield, Hertfordshire, England. The building is based on a seventeenth-century or earlier timber frame with a later red brick casing. The building is currently a highly rated pub.
